Damijanić (literally "little Damijan"), is a Croatian and Serbian surname.

See also
Damjanić
Damjanović
Damnjanović

Croatian surnames
Serbian surnames